

The Koolhoven F.K.40 was a small airliner built in the Netherlands in 1928 for KLM Royal Dutch Airlines. It was a conventional high-wing cantilever monoplane powered by a single engine in the nose. The fuselage was made of welded steel tube construction with a wooden wing skinned in plywood and held in place by four bolts to facilitate removal. The cabin was spacious for an aircraft of its size, and was intended to be readily reconfigured for passengers, mail, or freight. Although up to six seats could be fitted, the only F.K.40 built flew with four.

Operational history
This aircraft, registered PH-AES and nicknamed Piet Haas ("Peter Hare"), was operated by KLM until it was sold into private hands in 1936. Shortly thereafter, it was sold to the Spanish Republican Air Force, and was operated as an air ambulance during the Spanish Civil War.

Operators

Spanish Republican Air Force

Specifications

See also

References

Further reading

External links
 
 Koolhoven Aeroplanes Foundation
 Уголок неба

1920s Dutch airliners
F.K.40
High-wing aircraft
Single-engined tractor aircraft
Aircraft first flown in 1928